James Harold Crow (31 October 1885 – 7 September 1926) was an Australian rules footballer who played with St Kilda in the Victorian Football League (VFL).

Notes

External links 

1885 births
1926 deaths
Australian rules footballers from Victoria (Australia)
St Kilda Football Club players